CRNG may refer to:

 Cryptographic random number generator, in computing
 CRNG, the colour range chunk of the ILBM image file format